A chaldron (also chauldron or chalder) was an English measure of dry volume, mostly used for coal; the word itself is an obsolete spelling of cauldron. It was used from the 13th century onwards, nominally until 1963, when it was abolished by the Weights and Measures Act 1963, but in practice until the end of 1835, when the Weights and Measures Act of that year specified that thenceforth coal could only be sold by weight.

Coal
The chaldron was used as the measure for coal from the 13th century, measuring by volume being much more practical than weighing low-value, high-bulk commodities like coal. It was not standardized, and there were many different regional chaldrons, the two most important being the Newcastle and London chaldrons. The Newcastle chaldron was used to measure all coal shipped from Northumberland and Durham, and the London chaldron became the standard measure for coal in the east and south of England.

Many attempts have been made to calculate the weight of a Newcastle chaldron as used in medieval and early modern times.

The chaldron was the legal limit for horse-drawn coal waggons travelling by road as it was considered that heavier loads would cause too much damage to the roadways.

The value of a chaldron of coal depended on the size of the lumps of coal and also their water content. Unscrupulous merchants would purchase their coal in lumps as large as possible then sell them in smaller sizes. This was abolished by the Weights and Measures Act of 1835, which legislated that from January 1836 coal was only to be sold by weight.

See also 

 Chalder
 Corf (mining)
 Mine car 
 Minecart
 Mineral wagon
 Quarry tub

References

Notes

Sources

Imperial units
Coal